Monday Eguabor (born 10 August 1968) is a Nigerian wrestler. He competed in the men's freestyle 74 kg at the 1988 Summer Olympics.

References

External links
 

1968 births
Living people
Nigerian male sport wrestlers
Olympic wrestlers of Nigeria
Wrestlers at the 1988 Summer Olympics
Place of birth missing (living people)
20th-century Nigerian people